

Events

Pre-1600
49 BC – The Senate of Rome says that Caesar will be declared a public enemy unless he disbands his army, prompting the tribunes who support him to flee to where Caesar is waiting in Ravenna. 
1325 – Alfonso IV becomes King of Portugal.
1558 – French troops, led by Francis, Duke of Guise, take Calais, the last continental possession of England.

1601–1900
1608 – Fire destroys Jamestown, Virginia.
1610 – Galileo Galilei makes his first observation of the four Galilean moons: Ganymede, Callisto, Io and Europa, although he is not able to distinguish the last two until the following night.
1738 – A peace treaty is signed between Peshwa Bajirao and Jai Singh II following Maratha victory in the Battle of Bhopal.
1782 – The first American commercial bank, the Bank of North America, opens.
1785 – Frenchman Jean-Pierre Blanchard and American John Jeffries travel from Dover, England, to Calais, France, in a gas balloon.
1835 – , with Charles Darwin on board, drops anchor off the Chonos Archipelago.
1894 – Thomas Edison makes a kinetoscopic film of someone sneezing. On the same day, his employee, William Kennedy Dickson, receives a patent for motion picture film.

1901–present
1904 – The distress signal "CQD" is established only to be replaced two years later by "SOS".
1919 – Montenegrin guerrilla fighters rebel against the planned annexation of Montenegro by Serbia, but fail.
1920 – The New York State Assembly refuses to seat five duly elected Socialist assemblymen.
1922 – Dáil Éireann ratifies the Anglo-Irish Treaty by a 64–57 vote.
1927 – The first transatlantic commercial telephone service is established from New York City to London.
1928 – A disastrous flood of the River Thames kills 14 people and causes extensive damage to much of riverside London.
1931 – Guy Menzies flies the first solo non-stop trans-Tasman flight (from Australia to New Zealand) in 11 hours and 45 minutes, crash-landing on New Zealand's west coast.
1935 – Benito Mussolini and French Foreign minister Pierre Laval sign the Franco-Italian Agreement.
1940 – Winter War: Battle of Raate Road: The Finnish 9th Division finally defeat the numerically superior Soviet forces on the Raate-Suomussalmi road.
1948 – Kentucky Air National Guard pilot Thomas Mantell crashes while in pursuit of a supposed UFO.
1954 – Georgetown-IBM experiment: The first public demonstration of a machine translation system is held in New York at the head office of IBM.
1955 – Contralto Marian Anderson becomes the first person of color to perform at the Metropolitan Opera in Giuseppe Verdi's Un ballo in maschera. 
1959 – The United States recognizes the new Cuban government of Fidel Castro.
1968 – Surveyor Program: Surveyor 7, the last spacecraft in the Surveyor series, lifts off from launch complex 36A, Cape Canaveral.
1972 – Iberia Flight 602 crashes near Ibiza Airport, killing all 104 people on board.
1973 – In his second shooting spree of the week, Mark Essex fatally shoots seven people and wounds five others at Howard Johnson's Hotel in New Orleans, Louisiana, before being shot to death by police officers. 
1979 – Third Indochina War: Cambodian–Vietnamese War: Phnom Penh falls to the advancing Vietnamese troops, driving out Pol Pot and the Khmer Rouge.
1980 – U.S. President Jimmy Carter authorizes legislation giving $1.5 billion in loans to bail out the Chrysler Corporation.
1984 – Brunei becomes the sixth member of the Association of Southeast Asian Nations (ASEAN).
1985 – Japan Aerospace Exploration Agency launches Sakigake, Japan's first interplanetary spacecraft and the first deep space probe to be launched by any country other than the United States or the Soviet Union.
1991 – Roger Lafontant, former leader of the Tonton Macoute in Haiti under François Duvalier, attempts a coup d'état, which ends in his arrest.
1993 – The Fourth Republic of Ghana is inaugurated with Jerry Rawlings as president.
  1993   – Bosnian War: The Bosnian Army executes a surprise attack at the village of Kravica in Srebrenica.
1994 – A British Aerospace Jetstream 41 operating as United Express Flight 6291 crashes in Gahanna, Ohio, killing five of the eight people on board.
1999 – The Senate trial in the impeachment of U.S. President Bill Clinton begins.
2012 – A hot air balloon crashes near Carterton, New Zealand, killing all 11 people on board.
2015 – Two gunmen commit mass murder at the offices of Charlie Hebdo in Paris, shooting twelve people execution style, and wounding eleven others.
  2015 – A car bomb explodes outside a police college in the Yemeni capital Sana'a with at least 38 people reported dead and more than 63 injured.
2020 – The 6.4 2019–20 Puerto Rico earthquakes kill four and injure nine in southern Puerto Rico.
2023 – The longest U.S. House of Representatives speaker election since the December 1859 – February 1860 U.S. speaker election concludes and Kevin McCarthy is elected 55th Speaker of the United States House of Representatives.

Births

Pre-1600
 889 – Li Bian, emperor of Southern Tang (d. 943)
1355 – Thomas of Woodstock, 1st Duke of Gloucester, English politician, Lord High Constable of England (d. 1397)
1414 – Henry II, Count of Nassau-Siegen (d. 1451)
1502 – Pope Gregory XIII (d. 1585)

1601–1900
1634 – Adam Krieger, German organist and composer (d. 1666)
1647 – William Louis, Duke of Württemberg (d. 1677)
1685 – Jonas Alströmer, Swedish agronomist and businessman (d. 1761)
1706 – Johann Heinrich Zedler, German publisher (d. 1751)
1713 – Giovanni Battista Locatelli, Italian opera director and manager (d. 1785)
1718 – Israel Putnam, American general (d. 1790)
1746 – George Elphinstone, 1st Viscount Keith, Scottish admiral and politician (d. 1823)
1768 – Joseph Bonaparte, Italian king (d. 1844)
1797 – Mariano Paredes, Mexican general and 16th president (1845-1846) (d. 1849)
1800 – Millard Fillmore, American politician, 13th President of the United States (d. 1874)
1814 – Robert Nicoll, Scottish poet (d.1837)
1815 – Elizabeth Louisa Foster Mather, American writer (d.1882)
1827 – Sandford Fleming, Scottish-Canadian engineer, created Universal Standard Time (d. 1915)
1830 – Albert Bierstadt, American painter (d. 1902)
1831 – Heinrich von Stephan, German postman, founded the Universal Postal Union (d. 1897)
1832 – James Munro, Scottish-Australian publisher and politician, 15th Premier of Victoria (d. 1908)
1834 – Johann Philipp Reis, German physicist and academic, invented the Reis telephone (d. 1874)
1837 – Thomas Henry Ismay, English businessman, founded the White Star Line Shipping Company (d. 1899)
1844 – Bernadette Soubirous, French nun and saint (d. 1879)
1852 – Quianu Robinson, New Mexican Congressman and political ally of Conrad Hilton (d. 1919)
1858 – Eliezer Ben-Yehuda, Belarusian lexicographer and journalist (d. 1922)
1863 – Anna Murray Vail, American botanist and first librarian of the New York Botanical Garden (d. 1955)
1871 – Émile Borel, French mathematician and politician (d. 1956)
1873 – Charles Péguy, French poet and journalist (d. 1914)
  1873   – Adolph Zukor, Hungarian-American film producer, co-founded Paramount Pictures (d. 1976)
1875 – Gustav Flatow, German gymnast (d. 1945)
1876 – William Hurlstone, English pianist and composer (d. 1906)
1877 – William Clarence Matthews, American baseball player, coach, and lawyer (d. 1928)
1889 – Vera de Bosset, Russian-American ballerina (d. 1982)
1891 – Zora Neale Hurston, American novelist, short story writer, and folklorist (d. 1960)
1895 – Hudson Fysh, Australian pilot and businessman, co-founded Qantas Airways Limited (d. 1974)
1898 – Al Bowlly, Mozambican-English singer-songwriter (disputed; d. 1941)
1899 – Francis Poulenc, French pianist and composer (d. 1963)
1900 – John Brownlee, Australian actor and singer (d. 1969)

1901–present
1908 – Red Allen, American trumpet player (d. 1967)
1910 – Orval Faubus, American soldier and politician, 36th Governor of Arkansas (d. 1994)
1912 – Charles Addams, American cartoonist, created The Addams Family (d. 1988)
1913 – Johnny Mize, American baseball player, coach, and sportscaster (d. 1993)
1916 – W. L. Jeyasingham, Sri Lankan geographer and academic (d. 1989)
  1916   – Babe Pratt, Canadian ice hockey player (d. 1988)
1920 – Vincent Gardenia, Italian-American actor (d. 1992)
1921 – Esmeralda Arboleda Cadavid, Colombian politician (d. 1997)
  1921   – Chester Kallman, American poet and translator (d. 1975)
1922 – Alvin Dark, American baseball player and manager (d. 2014)
  1922   – Jean-Pierre Rampal, French flute player (d. 2000)
1923 – Hugh Kenner, Canadian scholar and critic (d. 2003)
1925 – Gerald Durrell, Indian-English zookeeper, conservationist and author, founded Durrell Wildlife Park (d. 1995)
1926 – Kim Jong-pil, South Korean lieutenant and politician, 11th Prime Minister of South Korea (d. 2018)
1928 – William Peter Blatty, American author and screenwriter (d. 2017)
1929 – Robert Juniper, Australian painter and sculptor (d. 2012)
  1929   – Terry Moore, American actress
1931 – Mirja Hietamies, Finnish skier (d. 2013)
1933 – Elliott Kastner, American-English film producer (d. 2010)
1934 – Jean Corbeil, Canadian lawyer and politician, 29th Canadian Minister of Labour (d. 2002)
  1934   – Tassos Papadopoulos, Cypriot lawyer and politician, 5th President of Cyprus (d. 2008)
1935 – Li Shengjiao, Chinese diplomat and international jurist (d. 2017) 
  1935   – Kenny Davern, American clarinet player and saxophonist (d. 2006)
  1935   – Valeri Kubasov, Russian engineer and astronaut (d. 2014)
1938 – Bob Boland, Australian rugby league player and coach
1941 – Iona Brown, English violinist and conductor (d. 2004)
  1941   – John E. Walker, English chemist and academic, Nobel Prize laureate
1942 – Vasily Alekseyev, Russian-German weightlifter and coach (d. 2011)
1943 – Sadako Sasaki, Japanese survivor of the atomic bombing of Hiroshima, known for one thousand origami cranes (d. 1955)
1944 – Mike McGear, British performing artist and rock photographer
  1944   – Kotaro Suzumura, Japanese economist and academic (d. 2020)
1945 – Raila Odinga, Kenyan engineer and politician, 2nd Prime Minister of Kenya
1946 – Michele Elliott, author, psychologist and founder of child protection charity Kidscape
  1946   – Jann Wenner, American publisher, co-founded Rolling Stone
1947 – Tony Elliott, English publisher, founded Time Out (d. 2020)
1948 – Kenny Loggins, American singer-songwriter 
1950 – Juan Gabriel, Mexican singer-songwriter (d. 2016)
1952 – Sammo Hung, Hong Kong actor, director, producer, and martial artist
1953 – Robert Longo, American painter and sculptor
1954 – Alan Butcher, English cricketer and coach
1955 – Mamata Shankar, Indian-Bengali actress
1956 – David Caruso, American actor
1957 – Katie Couric, American television journalist, anchor, and author
1959 – Angela Smith, Baroness Smith of Basildon, English accountant and politician
  1959   – Kathy Valentine, American bass player and songwriter
1960 – Loretta Sanchez, American politician
1961 – John Thune, American lawyer and politician
1962 – Aleksandr Dugin, Russian political analyst and strategist known for his fascist views 
  1962   – Ron Rivera, American football player and coach
1963 – Rand Paul, American politician and physician
1964 – Nicolas Cage, American actor
1965 – Alessandro Lambruschini, Italian runner
  1965   – Vladimir Ondrasik III (stage name: Five for Fighting), American singer-songwriter and pianist
1967 – Nick Clegg, English academic and politician, Deputy Prime Minister of the United Kingdom
  1967   – Ricky Stuart, Australian rugby player, coach, and sportscaster
1969 – Marco Simone, Italian footballer and manager
1970 – Andy Burnham, English politician
1971 – Kevin Rahm, American actor
  1971   – Jeremy Renner, American actor
1972 – Donald Brashear, American-Canadian ice hockey player and mixed martial artist
1974 – Alenka Bikar, Slovenian sprinter and politician
1976 – Vic Darchinyan, Armenian-Australian boxer
  1976   – Alfonso Soriano, Dominican baseball player
1977 – Dustin Diamond, American actor and comedian (d. 2021)
  1977   – Sofi Oksanen, Finnish author and playwright
1978 – Dean Cosker, English cricketer and umpire
1979 – Reggie Austin, American actor 
  1979   – Aloe Blacc, American musician, singer, songwriter, record producer, actor, businessman and philanthropist
  1980   – Reece Simmonds, Australian rugby league player
  1981   – Travis Friend, Zimbabwean cricketer
1982 – Lauren Cohan, American-British actress
  1982   – Francisco Rodríguez, Venezuelan baseball player
  1982   – Hannah Stockbauer, German swimmer
1983 – Brett Dalton, American actor 
  1983   – Edwin Encarnación, Dominican baseball player
1984 – Jon Lester, American baseball player
1985 – Lewis Hamilton, English racing driver
  1985   – Wayne Routledge, English footballer
1987 – Stefan Babović, Serbian footballer
  1987   – Lyndsy Fonseca, American actress
  1987   – Davide Astori, Italian footballer (d. 2018)
1988 – Scott Pendlebury, Australian footballer
1990 – Liam Aiken, American actor 
  1990   – Gregor Schlierenzauer, Austrian ski jumper
1991 – Eden Hazard, Belgian footballer
  1991   – Caster Semenya, South African sprinter
  1991   – Michael Walters, Australian footballer
1992 – Tohu Harris, New Zealand rugby league player
1994 – Lee Sun-bin, South Korean actress and singer
1995 – Yulia Putintseva, Kazakhstani tennis player
1997 – Ozzie Albies, Curaçaoan baseball player
  1997   – Lamar Jackson, American football player

Deaths

Pre-1600
 312 – Lucian of Antioch, Christian martyr, saint, and theologian (b. 240)
 838 – Babak Khorramdin, Iranian leader of the Khurramite uprising against the Abbasid Caliphate
 856 – Aldric, bishop of Le Mans
1131 – Canute Lavard, Danish prince and saint (b. 1096)
1285 – Charles I of Naples (b. 1226)
1325 – Denis of Portugal (b. 1261)
1355 – Inês de Castro, Castilian noblewoman (b. 1325)
1400 – John Montagu, 3rd Earl of Salisbury, English Earl (b. 1350)
1451 – Amadeus VIII of Savoy a.k.a. Antipope Felix V (b. 1383)
1529 – Peter Vischer the Elder, German sculptor (b. 1455)
1536 – Catherine of Aragon (b. 1485)
1566 – Louis de Blois, Flemish monk and author (b. 1506)

1601–1900
1619 – Nicholas Hilliard, English painter and goldsmith (b. 1547)
1625 – Ruggiero Giovannelli, Italian composer and author (b. 1560)
1655 – Pope Innocent X (b. 1574)
1658 – Theophilus Eaton, American farmer and politician, 1st Governor of the New Haven Colony (b. 1590)
1694 – Charles Gerard, 1st Earl of Macclesfield, English general and politician, Lord Lieutenant of Gloucestershire (b. 1618)
1700 – Raffaello Fabretti, Italian scholar and author (b. 1618)
1715 – François Fénelon, French archbishop, theologian, and poet (b. 1651)
1758 – Allan Ramsay, Scottish poet and playwright (b. 1686)
1767 – Thomas Clap, American minister and academic (b. 1703)
1770 – Carl Gustaf Tessin, Swedish politician and diplomat (b. 1695)
1812 – Joseph Dennie, American journalist and author (b. 1768)
1830 – John Thomas Campbell, Irish-Australian public servant and politician (b. 1770)
  1830   – Thomas Lawrence, English painter and educator (b. 1769)
1858 – Mustafa Reşid Pasha, Ottoman politician, Grand Vizier of the Ottoman Empire (b. 1800)
1864 – Caleb Blood Smith, American journalist and politician, 6th U.S. Secretary of the Interior (b. 1808)
1888 – Golam Ali Chowdhury, Bengali landlord and philanthropist (b. 1824)
1892 – Tewfik Pasha, Egyptian ruler (b. 1852)
1893 – Josef Stefan, Slovenian physicist and mathematician (b. 1835)

1901–present
1912 – Sophia Jex-Blake, English physician and feminist (b. 1840)
1919 – Henry Ware Eliot, American businessman and philanthropist, co-founded Washington University in St. Louis (b. 1843)
1920 – Edmund Barton, Australian judge and politician, 1st Prime Minister of Australia (b. 1849)
1927 – Nikolaos Kalogeropoulos, Greek politician, 99th Prime Minister of Greece (b. 1851)
1931 – Edward Channing, American historian and author (b. 1856)
1932 – André Maginot, French sergeant and politician (b. 1877)
1936 – Guy d'Hardelot, French pianist and composer (b. 1858)
1941 – Charles Finger, English journalist and author (b. 1869)
1943 – Nikola Tesla, Serbian-American physicist and engineer (b. 1856)
1951 – René Guénon, French-Egyptian philosopher and author (b. 1886)
1960 – Dorothea Douglass Lambert Chambers, English tennis player and coach (b. 1878)
1963 – Arthur Edward Moore, New Zealand-Australian farmer and politician, 23rd Premier of Queensland (b. 1876)
1964 – Reg Parnell, English racing driver and manager (b. 1911)
1967 – David Goodis, American author and screenwriter (b. 1917)
  1967   – Carl Schuricht, German-Swiss conductor (b. 1880)
1968 – J. L. B. Smith, South African chemist and academic (b. 1897)
1972 – John Berryman, American poet and scholar (b. 1914)
1981 – Alvar Lidell, English journalist and radio announcer(b. 1908)
  1981   – Eric Robinson, Australian businessman and politician, 2nd Australian Minister for Finance (b. 1926)
1984 – Alfred Kastler, German-French physicist and academic, Nobel Prize laureate (b. 1902)
1986 – Juan Rulfo, Mexican author, screenwriter, and photographer (b. 1917)
1988 – Zara Cisco Brough, American Nipmuc Indian chief and fashion designer (b.1919)
  1988   – Trevor Howard, English actor (b. 1913)
1989 – Hirohito, Japanese emperor (b. 1901)
1990 – Bronko Nagurski, Canadian-American football player and wrestler (b. 1908)
1992 – Richard Hunt, American puppeteer and voice actor (b. 1951)
1995 – Murray Rothbard, American economist, historian, and theorist (b. 1926)
1996 – Károly Grósz, Hungarian politician, 51st Prime Minister of Hungary (b. 1930)
1998 – Owen Bradley, American record producer (b. 1915)
  1998   – Vladimir Prelog, Croatian-Swiss chemist and academic, Nobel Prize laureate (b. 1906)
2000 – Gary Albright, American wrestler (b. 1963)
2001 – James Carr, American singer (b. 1942)
2002 – Avery Schreiber, American comedian and actor (b. 1935)
2004 – Ingrid Thulin, Swedish actress (b. 1926)
2005 – Pierre Daninos, French author (b. 1913)
2006 – Heinrich Harrer, Austrian mountaineer, geographer, and author (b. 1912)
2007 – Bobby Hamilton, American race car driver and businessman (b. 1957)
  2007   – Magnus Magnusson, Icelandic journalist, author, and academic (b. 1929)
2008 – Alwyn Schlebusch, South African academic and politician, Vice State President of South Africa (b. 1917)
2012 – Tony Blankley, British-born American child actor, journalist and pundit (b. 1948)
2014 – Run Run Shaw, Chinese-Hong Kong businessman and philanthropist, founded Shaw Brothers Studio and TVB (b. 1907)
2015 – Mompati Merafhe, Botswana general and politician, Vice-President of Botswana (b. 1936)
  2015   – Rod Taylor, Australian-American actor and screenwriter (b. 1930)
  2015   – Georges Wolinski, Tunisian-French cartoonist (b. 1934)
2016 – Bill Foster, American basketball player and coach (b. 1929)
  2016   – John Johnson, American basketball player (b. 1947)
  2016   – Kitty Kallen, American singer (b. 1921)
  2016   – Judith Kaye, American lawyer and jurist (b. 1938)
  2016   – Mufti Mohammad Sayeed, Indian lawyer and politician, Indian Minister of Home Affairs (b. 1936)
2017 – Mário Soares, Portuguese politician; 16th President of Portugal (b. 1924) 
2018 – Jim Anderton, Former New Zealand Deputy Prime Minister (b. 1938)
  2018   – France Gall, French singer (b. 1947)
2020 – Neil Peart, Canadian drummer, songwriter, and producer (b. 1952)
  2020   – Silvio Horta, American screenwriter and television producer (b. 1974)
  2020   – Elizabeth Wurtzel, author and feminist (b. 1967) 
2021 – Michael Apted, English filmmaker (b. 1941)
  2021   – Tommy Lasorda, American baseball player, coach, and manager (b. 1927)
  2021   – Henri Schwery, Swiss cardinal (b. 1932)

Holidays and observances
 Christian Feast Day:
 André Bessette (Canada) 
 Canute Lavard
 Charles of Sezze
 Felix and Januarius
 Lucian of Antioch
 Raymond of Penyafort
 Synaxis of John the Forerunner & Baptist (Julian Calendar)
 January 7 (Eastern Orthodox liturgics)
 Christmas (Eastern Orthodox Churches and Oriental Orthodox Churches using the Julian Calendar, Rastafari)
 Christmas in Russia
 Christmas in Ukraine
 Remembrance Day of the Dead (Armenia)
 Distaff Day (medieval Europe)
 Nanakusa no sekku (Japan)
 Pioneer's Day (Liberia)
 Tricolour day or Festa del Tricolore (Italy)
 Victory from Genocide Day (Cambodia)

References

External links

 BBC: On This Day
 
 Historical Events on January 7

Days of the year
January